The Wound Medal was established by the Independent State of Croatia "in honor of those who, as homeland defenders, were wounded or injured during combat with the enemy".

The medal had eight classes:
 Golden with oak leaves
 Golden with three stripes
 Golden with two stripes
 Golden with one stripe
 Iron with oak leaves
 Iron with three stripes
 Iron with two stripes
 Iron with one stripe

A golden wound medal was rewarded to those who had 61% (or more) of physical disability and killed, while iron wound medal was rewarded to those who had up to 60% of physical disability. The number of injuries was marked with one, two or three blue stripes, and for those who had more than three injuries, oak leaves were awarded.

The Wound Medal was introduced in mid-1943. As of 30 June 1944, 6,525 Wound Medals were awarded.

Sources

 Hrvatska odlikovanja (Croatian decorations) (mr. sc. Stjepan Adanić, general-major Krešimir Kašpar, prof. Boris Prister, prof. Ivan Ružič)
 

Orders, decorations, and medals of the Independent State of Croatia
Wound decorations